Merigi is a district (kecamatan) of Kepahiang Regency, Bengkulu, Indonesia.

Toponymy 
Merigi is a Malay's term  of original name in Rejang, Migai (or alternatively Migêi), which is taken from a farewell speech by Ki Geto (the founder of Merigi clan) to his brother Ki Karang Nio, "Uyo itê sa'ok, keme ami igai belek". These words are loosely translated into English "From now on we are detached (one another), we will not ever return". After the farewell, Ki Geto would led his people to established new villages outside Lebong, the heartland of Rejang people and stay there since then.

Administrative division 
Merigi is divided into six villages and one urban village, shown below.
 Taba Mulan
 Batu Ampar 
 Bukit Barisan 
 Durian Depun (urban village)
 Lubuk Penyamun 
 Pulo Geto 
 Pulo Geto Baru 
 Simpang Kota Bingin

The headquarter of the district is located in Durian Depun. All villages are under 5 km from the headquarter. The head 9) of Merigi district is Mr. Aji Abdullah.

Demography 
According to the Indonesian Census of 2020, Merigi has a population numbering 11.942 people, with 6.112  of them are males and the rest is females.

Economy 
Merigi's economy is generally based on agriculture and plantations, with the main commodities being corn, sweet potatoes, peanuts, coffee, cocoa, coconut, sugar palm, vanilla, kapok, areca nut, and cinnamon.

Reference

Bibliography

Books

Jurnal 
 

Districts of Kepahiang Regency